Rudi Patrick Vedelago (born 31 December 1980) is an Australian former rugby union player.

Biography
Born and raised in Brisbane, Rudi attended school at St. Joseph's College, Gregory Terrace between 1993 and 1997.

Playing career
After leaving school he played for the University of Queensland.

A very promising young player - Rudi represented Australia at schoolboy, U/19, U/21 and Australia A level, but beyond this level his career was interrupted by a string of injuries.

Vedelago played for the Queensland Reds and the Western Force in Super Rugby, retiring from professional rugby in 2007.

References

Australian rugby union players
Living people
1980 births
Rugby union players from Brisbane
Rugby union locks